Eupithecia graphiticata is a moth in the  family Geometridae. It is found in La Réunion where it is mostly found in high altitude forests in the end of the winter.

This species has a wingspan of 18-24mm and the larvae feed on Erica reunionensis, an Ericaceae.

References

graphiticata
Endemic fauna of Réunion
Moths of Réunion
Moths described in 1932